The Tukituki River is found in the eastern North Island of New Zealand. It flows from the Ruahine Ranges to the Pacific Ocean at the southern end of Hawke's Bay.

There, the Tukituki Valley is separated from Havelock North/Hastings by the craggy range of hills that includes Te Mata Peak.

Etymology
The Maori name Tukituki roughly translates "to demolish", presumably referring to the power of the river in flood. Maori legend has it that there are two taniwha living in lake at the southern end of the river that fought over a young boy after he fell into the lake. The struggle of the two taniwha was thought to split the river into the Waipawa and Tukituki Rivers and thereby draining the lake.

See also

Tributaries
Mangaonuku Stream

References

External links
Tukituki River in the 1966 Encyclopaedia of New Zealand

Rivers of the Hawke's Bay Region
Rivers of New Zealand